The secondary palate is an anatomical structure that divides the nasal cavity from the oral cavity in many vertebrates.

In human embryology, it refers to that portion of the hard palate that is formed by the growth of the two palatine shelves medially and their mutual fusion in the midline. It forms the majority of the adult palate and meets the primary palate at the incisive foramen.

Clinical significance
Secondary palate development begins in the sixth week of pregnancy and can lead to cleft palate when development goes awry.

There are three major mechanisms known to cause this failure:
Growth retardation — Palatal shelves do not grow enough to meet each other.
Mechanical obstruction — Improper mouth size, or abnormal anatomical structures in the embryonic mouth prevent fully grown shelves from meeting each other.
Midline epithelial dysfunction (MED) - The surface mucosa of embryonic shelves is impaired, which causes a failure of palatal fusion.

Evolution
The secondary palate is thought to have a significant role in the development of warm-blooded animals, separating the mouth from the nasal cavity, allowing chewing and breathing to occur together. The first creatures with secondary palates are known from the fossil record starting from the mid-Permian.

References

Palate